Collonge may refer to:

Places
France
Collonge-en-Charollais, in the Saône-et-Loire department
Collonge-la-Madeleine, in the Saône-et-Loire department

Switzerland
Collonge-Bellerive, in the canton of Geneva

See also
Collonges (disambiguation)